The Chief Justice of the Bahamas heads the Supreme Court of the Bahamas.

Legal basis
The position of Chief Justice is authorised by Article 93(2) of the Constitution of the Bahamas. Under Article 94(1), the Governor-General appoints the Chief Justice on the recommendation of the Prime Minister after consultation with the Leader of the Opposition. Removal of the Chief Justice is governed by Article 96(6); the Prime Minister recommends removal to the Governor-General, who then forms a tribunal of at least three members selected by the Governor-General in accordance with the advice of the Prime Minister. Under Article 98(2), the Chief Justice may be invited to sit on the Court of Appeal by the President of that Court.

List of Chief Justices

British Crown Colony of the Bahamas, 1718
 Thomas Walker, 1718– (died 1723)
 Sir William Morison, c.1770
 Thomas Atwood, 1773-1785
 John Matson, 1785-1789 (afterwards Chief Justice of Dominica, 1789)
 Stephen de Lancey c.1790–1797
 Moses Franks  1799–1805   (died 1810) United States Gazette, March 6, 1805. Phila., PA
 William Vesey Munnings 1811–1836
 Sir John Campbell Lees 1836–1865 
 Sir William Henry Doyle 1865– 
 Sir George Campbell Anderson 1875– 
 Henry William Austin, 1880–1890 
 Roger Yelverton (1890–1893)
 (Sir) Charles George Walpole, 1893–1897 
 Sir Ormond Drimmie Malcolm 1897–1910
 Sir John Bromhead Matthews 1910–1911 
 Sir Sidney Charles Nettleton 1922–1924 (afterwards Chief Justice of Cyprus, 1924)
 Sir Ewen Reginald Logan 1925–1927
 Sir Kenneth James Beatty 1927–1931 (afterwards Chief Justice of Gibraltar, 1931) 
 Sir Richard Clifford Tute, K.C.M.G, 1932-1939
 Sir Oscar Bedford Daly, 1939– 
 Sir Oswald Lawrence Bancroft, 1951- 
 Sir Guy Wilmot McLintock Henderson ?1956–1960 
 Sir Ralph Abercrombie Campbell, 10 August 1960 to 31 May 1970
 William Gordon Bryce, C.B.E., Q.C., 1 June 1970 to 30 June 1973

Bahamas after independence in 1973
 Sir Leonard J. Knowles, 4 July 1973 to 6 August 1978
 James Alfred Smith, 7 July 1978 to 11 May 1980
 Harvey Lloyd da Costa, 18 November 1980 to 31 December 1981
 Vivian O. Blake, 1 January 1982 to 9 September 1983
 Sir Denis Eustace Gilbert Malone (acting), 10 September to 31 December 1983
 Rt. Hon. Mr. Philip Telford Georges, 1 January 1984 to 30 September 1989
 Sir Joaquim Gonsalves Sabola, 1 October 1989 to 31 December 1995
 Sir Cyril S. S. Fountain, 1 January 1995 to 30 October 1996
 Dame Joan A. Sawyer, DBE, 1 November 1996 to 26 November 2001
 Sir Burton P. C. Hall, KSS, KHS, 2001 to 2009
 Hon. Sir Michael L. Barnett, 24 August 2009 to 31 January 2015 
 Hon. Sir Hartman Longley, 2 February 2015 to 22 December 2017 
Hon. Stephen Isaacs, 10 August 2018 to 24 August 2018
Hon. Sir Brian Moree, KC, 12 June 2019 to 3 August 2022
Hon. Sir Ian Winder, 3 August 2022 to Present

References

Judiciary of the Bahamas